JDS Michishio (SS-564) was the third boat of thes. She was commissioned on 29 August 1968.

Construction and career
Harushio was laid down at Kawasaki Heavy Industries Kobe Shipyard on 26 July 1966 and launched on 5 December 1967. She was commissioned on 29 August 1968, into the 1st Submarine Group Incorporated into the 3rd Submarine.

Participated in Hawaii dispatch training from May 15 to August 4, 1970.

On 16 October 1973, the 3rd Submarine was reorganized into the 2nd Submarine Group, which was newly formed under the Self-Defense Fleet.

On 20 August 1981, she was transferred to the 2nd Submarine Group of the 1st Submarine Group.

She was decommissioned on 27 March 1985.

Citations

1967 ships
Asashio-class submarines
Ships built by Kawasaki Heavy Industries